Petruş Ionel Gavrilă (8 July 1988, Feteşti) is a Romanian sprint canoeist. At the 2012 Summer Olympics, he competed in the Men's K-4 1000 metres, finishing in 8th place with the team in the final.

References

Romanian male canoeists
Living people
Olympic canoeists of Romania
Canoeists at the 2012 Summer Olympics
European Games competitors for Romania
Canoeists at the 2015 European Games

1988 births
People from Fetești